Heinrich Krone (1 December 1895 – 15 August 1989) was a German politician of the Christian Democratic Union (CDU).

Shortly after beginning his Theology study in 1914, Krone was drafted into service in World War I. After the war Krone continued his study, joining the Catholic Center Party in 1923. He held a variety of positions within the party before being elected to the Reichstag in 1925. He remained in the Reichstag until 1933. Immediately following the fall of the Third Reich Krone played an integral role in establishing the new Christian Democratic Union (CDU) party in Berlin. In 1949 he served in the first post-war West German Bundestag. From 1955 to 1961 he served as the chairman of the CDU faction in the Bundestag, and was a trusted colleague of Chancellor Konrad Adenauer. He remained in the Bundestag until 1969, serving several times as a minister under Chancellors Konrad Adenauer and Ludwig Erhard.

1895 births
1989 deaths
People from Hameln-Pyrmont
German Roman Catholics
Centre Party (Germany) politicians
Government ministers of Germany
People from Hesse-Nassau
Members of the Reichstag of the Weimar Republic
Members of the Bundestag for Lower Saxony
Members of the Bundestag 1965–1969
Members of the Bundestag 1961–1965
Members of the Bundestag 1957–1961
Members of the Bundestag 1953–1957
Members of the Bundestag 1949–1953
Members of the Bundestag for Berlin
Members of the Bundestag for the Christian Democratic Union of Germany